The 2013 Men's South American Volleyball Championship was the 30th edition of the tournament, organised by CSV. It was held in Cabo Frio, Brazil from 6 to 10 August 2013. The top two teams qualified for the 2014 World Championship and the champions also qualified for the 2013 World Grand Champions Cup.

Initially, format of the tournament was two pools of three teams with semifinals and final. But, CSV changed format to five-team round-robin after Venezuela withdrew.

Teams
 (Hosts)

Venue

Pool standing procedure
 Match points
 Number of matches won
 Sets ratio
 Points ratio
 Result of the last match between the tied teams

Match won 3–0 or 3–1: 3 match points for the winner, 0 match points for the loser
Match won 3–2: 2 match points for the winner, 1 match point for the loser

Round robin
All times are Brasília Time (UTC−03:00).

|}

|}

Final standing

Awards

Most Valuable Player
  Sidnei Santos
Best Setter
  Bruno Rezende
Best Outside Spikers
  Ricardo Lucarelli Souza
  Rodrigo Quiroga

Best Middle Blockers
  Sidnei Santos
  Sebastian Solé
Best Opposite Spiker
  Alexander Moreno
Best Libero
  Mario Pedreira

External links
Organizer website

Men's South American Volleyball Championships
South American
Men's South American Volleyball Championship
Volleyball
International volleyball competitions hosted by Brazil
August 2013 sports events in South America